Splachnidiaceae is a family of brown algae in the order Scytothamnales.

References

External links

Scytothamnales
Brown algae families